School of Creative and Performing Arts or School for Performing and Visual Arts, and variations, may refer to:

United States 
 Booker T. Washington High School for the Performing and Visual Arts, Dallas, Texas
 Emerson School for Visual and Performing Arts, Gary, Indiana
 High School for the Performing and Visual Arts, Houston, Texas
 High School of Performing Arts, in New York, New York
 Las Vegas Academy of International Studies, Performing, and Visual Arts, Las Vegas, Nevada
 Philadelphia High School for the Creative and Performing Arts, a high school in Philadelphia, Pennsylvania
 Ramon C. Cortines School of Visual and Performing Arts, Los Angeles, California
 San Diego School of Creative and Performing Arts, a school in San Diego, California

Other
 Etobicoke School of the Arts, Toronto, Ontario
 Philippine High School for the Arts, Mount Makiling, Los Baños, Laguna
 Victoria School of Performing and Visual Arts, Edmonton, Alberta
 Humber School of Creative and Performing Arts, of Humber College, Toronto, Ontario

See also 
 School of the Arts (disambiguation)
 SCPA (disambiguation)